Li Li (born 7 July 1983) is a Chinese-born Singaporean badminton player.

Early life 
Li was born in Wuhan, China and moved to Singapore in 1997. She became a Singapore citizen in 2002.

Career 
Li won the 2002 Commonwealth Games women's singles gold medal by beating favourite Tracey Hallam of England in four sets, causing a major upset for the home team. It was the first Commonwealth Games badminton gold for Singapore.

Li was part of the women's team at the 2003 Southeast Asian Games which won the gold medal. Li also played at the 2004 Summer Olympics, losing to Gong Ruina of China in the round of 32. At the 2006 Asian Games, she was part of the women's team which took the bronze medal.

Li resigned from the Singapore Badminton Association in January 2008 and returned to Wuhan.

Awards 
Li received the 2003 and 2005 Meritorious Award from the Singapore National Olympic Committee.

Achievements

Commonwealth Games 
Women's singles

BWF International Challenge/Series 
Women's singles

Women's doubles

Mixed doubles

References

External links 
 
 Singapore to do Welsh homework at BBC

1983 births
Living people
Badminton players from Wuhan
Chinese emigrants to Singapore
Singaporean sportspeople of Chinese descent
Naturalised citizens of Singapore
Chinese female badminton players
Singaporean female badminton players
Badminton players at the 2004 Summer Olympics
Olympic badminton players of Singapore
Badminton players at the 2002 Commonwealth Games
Badminton players at the 2006 Commonwealth Games
Commonwealth Games gold medallists for Singapore
Commonwealth Games silver medallists for Singapore
Commonwealth Games medallists in badminton
Badminton players at the 2002 Asian Games
Badminton players at the 2006 Asian Games
Asian Games bronze medalists for Singapore
Asian Games medalists in badminton
Medalists at the 2006 Asian Games
Competitors at the 2003 Southeast Asian Games
Competitors at the 2005 Southeast Asian Games
Competitors at the 2007 Southeast Asian Games
Southeast Asian Games gold medalists for Singapore
Southeast Asian Games silver medalists for Singapore
Southeast Asian Games bronze medalists for Singapore
Southeast Asian Games medalists in badminton
Medallists at the 2002 Commonwealth Games